The 1984 Los Angeles Raiders season was the franchise's 25th season overall, and the franchise's 15th season in the National Football League. The Raiders entered the season as defending Super Bowl champions. However, they failed to improve upon their previous season's output of 12–4, winning only eleven games. Despite finishing third in their division, the team qualified for the playoffs for the third consecutive season. However, their season would quickly end, as they lost in the wild card game 7–13 to division rival Seattle Seahawks.

Roster

Schedule

Game summaries

Week 1

Week 2

Week 10: at Chicago Bears

Playoffs

Schedule

Game summaries

AFC Wild Card Playoffs: at (No. 4) Seattle Seahawks

Standings

References 

Los Angeles Raiders seasons
Los Angeles Raiders
Los